96/69 is the first remix album by Japanese musician Cornelius. It was released on June 9, 1996 by Trattoria Records. The album is a companion to Cornelius' second studio album 69/96, which was released the previous year. 96/69 peaked at number six on the Oricon Albums Chart.

Track listing

Notes
 Tracks 11 to 68 and 70 to 95 are silent.

Personnel
Credits are adapted from the album's liner notes.

 Keigo Oyamada – production
 Masakazu Kitayama – design
 Yuka Koizumi – mastering
 Ken Makimura – executive production
 Ichiro Oka – direction
 Mitsuo Shindō – art direction
 Terumasa Yabushita – direction

Charts

References

External links
 
 

1996 remix albums
Cornelius (musician) albums
Japanese-language remix albums